Massimiliano Mola (born 1 December 1971) is a former Italian sport shooter who won a medal at individual senior level at the World Championships.

Achievements

References

External links
 

1971 births
Living people
Trap and double trap shooters
Italian male sport shooters